Lepidoblepharis xanthostigma, also known as the yellow-spotted gecko is a species of gecko, a lizard in the family Sphaerodactylidae. The species is found in Central America and north-western South America.

Geographic range
L. xanthostigma is found in Nicaragua, Costa Rica, Panama, and Colombia.

Reproduction
L. xanthostigma is oviparous.

References

Further reading
Noble GK (1916). "Description of a New Eublepharid Lizard from Costa Rica". Proceedings of the Biological Society of Washington 29: 87–88. (Lathrogecko xanthostigma, new species).

Lepidoblepharis
Reptiles described in 1916